Roland J. McKay is an Australian-born biologist known for his work in exotic and translocated freshwater fish in Australia. McKay is curator of fishes at the Queensland Museum and his work has been quoted extensively. He also contributed a key section on "Introductions of Exotic Fishes in Australia" in Distribution, Biology and Management of Exotic Fishes published by Johns Hopkins University Press.

Biography 
Earlier in his career, McKay focused on introduction and translocation of exotic freshwater fish in Australia. He extensively researched the Australian Aquarium Industry. Later, he also extended his study to fish that were not exotic but just unusual.

He is recognised as an authority on the fishes of the Family Sillaginidae
McKay, R.J.1985.A Revision of the fishes of the family Sillaginidae.
Mem.Qd.Museum, 22(1):1-73.

McKay, R.J. 1992. FAO Species Catalogue 14. Sillaginid fishes of the world (Family Sillaginidae). An Annotated and Illustrated Catalogue of the Sillago, Smelt or Indo-Pacific Whiting species Known to Date. FAO Fisheries Synopsis, No. 125, Vol. 14. 1992. 87 p., 137 figs.

Institute in San Diego, California, McKay participated in the symposium on "Jumbo Squid Invasions in the Eastern Pacific Ocean".

See also
:Category:Taxa named by Roland J. McKay

References
 McKay, R.J., 1984. Introductions of exotic fishes in Australia. In Courtenay, W.R. Jr. and J.R. Stauffer, Jr. (Editors). Distribution, Biology and Management of Exotic fishes. The Johns Hopkins University Press, Baltimore, Maryland, USA., 1984, p. 177-199
 VOL. 17. PEARL PERCHES OF THE WORLD An annotated and illustrated catalogue of the pearl perches known to date ftp://ftp.fao.org/docrep/fao/009/w5263e/w5263e00.pdf
Arthington, A.H., D.A. Milton and R.J. McKay (1983). Effects of urban development and habitat alterations on the distribution and abundance of native and fresh- water fish in the Brisbaneregion, Queensland.Austra1- ian Journal of Ecology 8.87-101
FAO SPECIES IDENTIFICATION SHEETS-FOR FISHERY PURPOSES EASTERN INDIAN OCEAN Fishing Area and WESTERN CENTRAL PACIFIC ftp://ftp.fao.org/docrep/fao/009/e9163e/E9163e1a.pdf
 Arthington A.H., R.J. McKay and D.A. Milton, 1983. Effects of urban development and habitat alteration on the distribution and abundance of native and exotic fish in the Brisbane region, Queensland. Aust. J. Ecol. 8. 87-101.

External links
 VOL. 17. PEARL PERCHES OF THE WORLD An annotated and illustrated catalogue of the pearl perches known to date ftp://ftp.fao.org/docrep/fao/009/w5263e/w5263e00.pdf
 CalCOFI Conference 2007 Featuring a Symposium on Jumbo Squid Invasions in the Eastern Pacific Ocean http://oceaninformatics.ucsd.edu/calcofi/conference/

20th-century Australian zoologists
Living people
Fisheries scientists
Year of birth missing (living people)